William Kinnerk (14 November 1907 – 6 September 1983) was an Irish Gaelic footballer and local politician. At club level he played with the John Mitchels club and was an All-Ireland Championship medallist with the Kerry senior football team.

Playing career

Born in Tralee, Kinnerk first played competitive Gaelic football with Tralee Technical School. After lining out with a number of local clubs, he joined John Mitchels and claimed his first Kerry Senior Football Championship medal in his debut year in 1929. He claimed a second county medal as team captain in 1937. Kinnerk first joined the Kerry senior football team in 1932 and ended the year by winning his first All-Ireland Senior Football Championship medal as a substitute. He broke onto the starting fifteen the following year, and was a regular member of the team until his retirement after a tour of the United States in 1939. During that time Kinnerk won five Munster Championship medals as well as claiming an All-Ireland medal on the field of play in 1937.

Honours

Dingle
Kerry Senior Football Championship (2): 1929, 1937 (c)

Kerry
All-Ireland Senior Football Championship (2): 1932, 1937
Munster Senior Football Championship (5): 1932, 1934, 1936, 1937, 1938 (c)

References

External link

 Bill Kinnerk profile at the Terrace Talk website

1907 births
1983 deaths
John Mitchels (Kerry) Gaelic footballers
Kerry inter-county Gaelic footballers
Munster inter-provincial Gaelic footballers